Ploger-Moneymaker Place, also known as Aambler, is a historic home located at Lebanon, Laclede County, Missouri.  It was built about 1870, and is a two-story, "T"-shaped frame dwelling. It features a wraparound front porch supported by round columns and a two-story bay with decorative moulding.

It was listed on the National Register of Historic Places in 1982.

References

Houses on the National Register of Historic Places in Missouri
Houses completed in 1870
Buildings and structures in Laclede County, Missouri
National Register of Historic Places in Laclede County, Missouri
1870 establishments in Missouri